Apeman or ape-man may refer to:

 historically, a term for archaic humans, see:
Missing link (human evolution)
Pithecanthropus ("ape-man"), historical taxon now synonymous with Homo
Chimpanzee–human last common ancestor
 Cryptozoological creatures like Bigfoot and Yeti
 Humanzee, hypothetical human-chimpanzee hybrids

Popular culture
 Tarzan, sometimes referred to as an "Apeman"
 Mangani in the Tarzan fictional stories
 different ape-men species from Kull's Thurian Age and Conan's Hyborian Age
 evolved apes in the Planet of the Apes universe
 Ape-Man, a comic book character
 "Apeman" (song), a 1970 song by The Kinks
 The Apemen (band), a Dutch surf rock band
 The Ape Man (film), 1943 U.S. sci-fi horror film

Other uses
 Tarzan, the Ape Man (disambiguation)

See also 

 The Ape Woman, a 1964 Italian-French drama film directed by Marco Ferreri
Anthropopithecus, called "man-ape", historical taxon now synonymous with Pan (the chimpanzee)
 Caveman
 Hominidae
 Neanderthals in popular culture
 Man-Ape, a Marvel Comics character
 
 
 Humanoid (disambiguation)
 Ape (disambiguation)
 Man (disambiguation)